David M. Anthony House may refer to:

David M. Anthony House (Fall River, Massachusetts)
David M. Anthony House (Swansea, Massachusetts)